Reto Suri (born 25 March 1989) is a Swiss professional ice hockey forward who currently plays for EV Zug of the National League (NL).

Playing career
After his first season with Zug in 2012–13, Suri gained NHL attention and signed a two-year entry-level contract with the Tampa Bay Lightning on June 13, 2013. However, with an existing contract signed with Zug and at the time no transfer agreement with between the Swiss and International Hockey Federations, Suri's contract was voided a month later on July 12, 2013.

Harbouring no ill will, Suri responded with a then career high 36 points in the 2013–14 season for Zug and was later signed to a four-year contract extension with an NHL-out clause on September 30, 2014.

At the conclusion of the 2018–19 season, Suri left Zug as a free agent and joined HC Lugano on a two-year deal through the 2020–21 season.

International play
Suri competed in the 2013 IIHF World Championship as a member of the Switzerland men's national ice hockey team, finishing in Switzerland's highest ever position with a silver medal.

Career statistics

Regular season and playoffs

International

References

External links

1989 births
Living people
EHC Bülach players
Genève-Servette HC players
Ice hockey players at the 2014 Winter Olympics
EHC Kloten players
Lausanne HC players
Olympic ice hockey players of Switzerland
SC Rapperswil-Jona Lakers players
Ice hockey people from Zürich
Swiss ice hockey left wingers
EV Zug players